Venmankondan (West) is a village in the Udayarpalayam taluk of Ariyalur district, Tamil Nadu, India.

Demographics 

As per the 2001 census, Venmankondan (West) had a total population of 2775 with 1347 males and 1428 females.

References 

Villages in Ariyalur district